NC By Train is a brand name used by the Rail Division of the North Carolina Department of Transportation (NCDOT) for two state-supported Amtrak routes operating in the U. S. state of North Carolina–the Carolinian and the Piedmont.

History
Amtrak (in full, the National Railroad Passenger Corporation) took over most intercity rail service in the United States in 1971. At the outset, service through North Carolina was mostly limited to long-distance routes that were not well-suited for regional travel. This remained unchanged when Southern Railway, one of the larger railroads that initially opted to keep its passenger services, handed its routes to Amtrak in 1979.

By 1984, Amtrak service in North Carolina was limited to four trains: the New Orleans–New York Crescent, which passed through Charlotte and the Piedmont Triad; the New York–Miami Silver Meteor and New York–Savannah Palmetto, which both passed through the Sandhills; and the New York–Miami Silver Star, which passed through Raleigh. The only daylight service came from the Palmetto and northbound Silver Star.

In that year, Governor Jim Hunt created a Public Transportation Division within NCDOT. Partly due to Hunt's efforts, Amtrak introduced the Carolinian on October 28, 1984 as a Charlotte-New York service, supported with a yearly $436,000 state subsidy. It ran from Charlotte through Greensboro and Raleigh along the state-owned North Carolina Railroad, then joined the Palmetto at Richmond, Virginia for the journey to New York.  It was the first direct service between Charlotte and Raleigh in 30 years (or 50 years, depending on the source), and the first North Carolina-focused service in 20 years.

Amtrak intended the Carolinian to be a one-year pilot project, and strongly considered making it a permanent fixture in its schedule. However, due to poor marketing, many passengers did not know that the train offered much of the state a one-seat ride to New York. As a result, while ridership far exceeded projections, the Carolinian lost over $800,000 as most passengers opted to travel within North Carolina and not continue north of the Virginia border. When North Carolina declined to increase its subsidy, Amtrak withdrew the Carolinian on September 3, 1985.

Hunt's successor, Jim Martin, was also committed to the development of passenger rail. He created a Passenger Rail Task Force that recommended preserving rail corridors for both freight and passengers. It also recommended additional passenger service along the I-85 Corridor from Charlotte to Raleigh. In 1990, Amtrak and the state introduced a second incarnation of the Carolinian. It ran along the same route as its 1984-85 predecessor, but joined the Palmetto at Rocky Mount. This incarnation was successful enough that within a year, Amtrak not only made the Carolinian permanent, but made it a full-fledged day train running independently from Charlotte to New York.

Building on this success, NCDOT formed a Rail Unit, which was expanded to a full-fledged division in 1995. During this time, state officials pressed for additional service along the fast-growing I-85 Corridor. However, Amtrak initially balked, claiming that it didn't have enough rolling stock to spare. NCDOT decided to buy its own equipment. In the fall of 1990, NCDOT bought five repurposed coaches and leased two locomotives for the planned Charlotte-Raleigh service, named the Piedmont, which began service on May 25, 1995.
 It would have begun service sooner, but Norfolk Southern Railway, which operates the North Carolina Railroad under a longstanding lease with the state, insisted that the state build a wye in Charlotte to turn the trains around. Previously, the southbound Carolinian had to make a time-consuming 10-mile deadhead trip to the nearest wye in Pineville, North Carolina. A second round trip was added in 2010, followed by a third in 2018, with a fourth to come in 2021.

Marketing and operations
Unlike many states that subsidize Amtrak routes within their borders, North Carolina handles much of the marketing and operations for its state-subsidized services itself. It continued to distribute printed timetables for the Carolinian and Piedmont after Amtrak discontinued printed timetables. It operates a toll-free information line, 800-BY-TRAIN, which is staffed by North Carolinians. NCDOT also sets the schedules for the Piedmont and owns the equipment, though it is operated by Amtrak train crews.

The NCDOT offers free transit passes which allow detraining Carolinian and Piedmont passengers to get one free bus ride and one transfer on the same day of travel. Passes are honored by 13 participating transit systems along its route.

Routes

Carolinian

The Carolinian, operating since 1990 and in its current form since 1991, is a  route from Charlotte to New York, running once daily in each direction. It serves Charlotte, Kannapolis, Salisbury, High Point, Greensboro, Burlington, Durham, Cary, Raleigh, Selma, Wilson and Rocky Mount before continuing to the Northeast Corridor via Richmond. North Carolina subsidizes the train from Charlotte to the Virginia border.

It is augmented by three Amtrak Thruway Motorcoach routes, two connecting Wilson to large swaths of eastern North Carolina and one connecting Winston-Salem and High Point.

Volunteers from the North Carolina Train Host Association are on hand between Charlotte and Selma to provide information about points of interest in North Carolina. Station hosts are also on hand at the state's three busiest stations–Charlotte, Greensboro and Raleigh. 

The Kannapolis, Salisbury, High Point, Burlington and Selma stations are served by NC Station Attendants who meet all trains and answer travel questions. The other stations along the route are staffed with Amtrak personnel with full ticketing and baggage service.

Piedmont

The Piedmont, operating since 1995, is a  route from Charlotte to Raleigh with three daily round trips. It travels along the far southern leg of the Carolinian route, largely paralleling Interstate 85. While the Carolinian uses Amtrak rolling stock painted in Amtrak's national red-white-blue scheme, the Piedmont uses state-owned locomotives and coaches painted in a blue-silver-red palette echoing the North Carolina state flag. Its introduction enabled same-day business travel between Charlotte and Raleigh.

Proposed routes

Southeast Corridor

Salisbury – Asheville

Western North Carolina had been served by passenger trains following the construction of the Western North Carolina Railroad in the 1850s until the Southern Railway discontinued service in August 1975.

In January 1997, NCDOT's Rail Division first studied the possibility of restoring service to the region. Based on projected costs, revenue, and ridership, the best option was determined to be a route between Salisbury and Asheville along 139 miles of Norfolk Southern's S-Line. Intermediate stops would be made in Statesville, Hickory, Morganton, Marion, Old Fort, and Black Mountain. Passenger could transfer to the Piedmont or Carolinian at Salisbury station.

In 1999, local stakeholders formed the Western North Carolina Rail Corridor Committee to promote enactment of the route.

In March 2001, NCDOT published an updated study with a timetable of phases for the project, along with a cost estimate for each phase. During the first phase, Amtrak would trial the route with Thruway Bus service along US 70 to Asheville. The report also recommended an additional station in Valdese.

In April 2002, an NCDOT report proposed a schedule of two daily round trips on the route: one morning and one evening departure in each direction. The report estimated that the station, track, signal, and bridge projects required to start the route would cost $134,700,000.

North Carolina's Comprehensive State Rail Plan, last published in August 2015, continues to recommend the rail route and interim Thruway Bus service. The plan estimates a cost of $405,300,000 in 2014 dollars and a ridership of 24,000 in the first year. Noting the age of the original studies, NCDOT prescribes an updated study.

In March 2021, Amtrak included the route in its "Amtrak Connects Us" 15-year expansion vision ahead of the Biden administration's push to pass the American Jobs Plan.

Raleigh – Wilmington

In May 2001, NCDOT's Southeastern North Carolina Passenger Rail Feasibility Study showed strong interest in trains from Raleigh to Wilmington. A July 2005 study recommended that two new routes be added to the State Rail Plan. Both routes would start by following the Carolinian and Silver Star corridor from Raleigh to Selma.

The "Goldsboro route" would continue southeast from Selma to Goldsboro, then head south to Wilmington with potential stops in Mount Olive, Warsaw, Wallace, Burgaw, and Castle Hayne. This route is the most direct but would require rebuilding 27 miles of track and six rail bridges.

The "Fayetteville route" would follow the Palmetto and Silver Meteor corridor southwest from Selma through Fayetteville, then at a new station in Pembroke, branch southeast to Wilmington with potential stops in Lumberton, Bladenboro, Acme/Riegelwood, and Navassa.

The 2015 State Rail Plan continues to recommend both routes, listing the estimated cost of the Goldsboro route at $262,500,000 in 2014 dollars and its first-year ridership at 29,000, though the plan also requests new studies to update these figures.

In March 2021, Amtrak included the Goldsboro route to Wilmington in its "Amtrak Connects Us" 15-year expansion vision.

Charlotte – Lynchburg, Virginia

Service between Charlotte and Lynchburg, Virginia, is currently provided once daily by the long-distance Crescent. NCDOT is performing a preliminary evaluation for additional service, which may be achieved by extending a Northeast Regional round trip to Charlotte. The cost has been estimated at $35,600,000 in 2014 dollars.

Raleigh – Greenville

One or more Piedmont round trips could be extended from Raleigh to Greenville along the Carolina Coastal Railway, connecting with the Palmetto and Silver Service at Wilson station.

In July 2022, planners from NCDOT and Pitt County announced they would hire a contractor to conduct a feasibility study of the route after receiving a $250,000 federal grant. The study is expected to take 18 months. Supporters of the study include Greenville Mayor P.J. Connelly, East Carolina University Chancellor Philip Rogers, State Representative Brian Farkas, and the head of the Pitt-Greenville Convention & Visitors Authority.

Raleigh – Morehead City

Service from Raleigh to Morehead City via Selma Union Depot would be possible along existing Norfolk Southern track, with intermediate stops in Goldsboro, Kinston, and New Bern.

Raleigh – Hampton Roads, Virginia

NCDOT has suggested studying service from Raleigh to Hampton Roads, Virginia's second-largest metropolitan area, home to Virginia Beach and Norfolk. The proposed route would require reconstruction of a disused Raleigh and Gaston Railroad line between Norlina and Roanoke Rapids.

References

External links
NC By Train official site

Amtrak
North Carolina railroads
Transportation in North Carolina